Federal Republic of Nigeria Official Gazette is the government gazette for the Federal Republic of Nigeria. It has been published at Lagos since 1963 and replaced the Federation of Nigeria Official Gazette.

References

External links
 Federal Republic of Nigeria Official Gazette - Nigeria LII
Nigeria official publications at the British Library

Newspapers established in 1963
Government gazettes of Nigeria
Law of Nigeria
1963 establishments in Nigeria